The second series of British talent competition programme Britain's Got Talent was broadcast on ITV, from 12 April to 31 May 2008. Following the success of its first series, ITV commissioned the programme for additional episodes, with more venues used for auditions than in the previous series, and the number of semi-finalists, semi-final rounds, and finalists increased by production staff. Both the judges from the first series - Simon Cowell, Amanda Holden and Piers Morgan - and Ant & Dec returned to co-host the second series, along with Stephen Mulhern returning to front the second series of Britain's Got More Talent on ITV2.

The second series was won by street dancer George Sampson and finishing in first place and dance duo Signature finishing in second place. During its broadcast, the series proved to be a greater ratings success, averaging 10.2 million viewers. ITV was forced to defend the programme during its second series, after viewers criticised the involvement of a professional group in the contest.

Series overview
Following open auditions held the previous year, the Judge's Auditions took place early in 2008, within London, Manchester, Birmingham, Cardiff, Glasgow and Blackpool. With the success of the previous series, the production team decided to expand the show's filming schedule to include more episodes. This led to the addition of two more episodes for auditions and two more live episodes for semi-finals, in turn leading to a direct increase in the number of semi-finalists that the judges could move beyond the auditions stage of the competition. Both the judges and the presenters who took part in the first series agreed to return for the second series, leading to no significant changes in the panel or hosts. 

Of the participants that took part, only forty made it past this stage and into the five live semi-finals, with eight appearing in each one, and ten of these acts making it into the live final. The following below lists the results of each participant's overall performance in this series:

 |  |  | 

  Ages denoted for a participant(s), pertain to their final performance for this series.
  The latter value pertains to the age of the dog, as disclosed by its owner.

Semi-final summary
 Buzzed out |  Judges' vote | 
 |  |

Semi-final 1 (26 May)

Semi-final 2 (27 May)

Semi-final 3 (28 May)

Semi-final 4 (29 May)

  Simon pressed Holden's buzzers during Vizage's performance.

Semi-final 5 (30 May)

Final (31 May)

 | 

  The results did not declare any other position than that of the winner, 2nd place, and 3rd place.

Ratings

Criticism
The second series of Britain's Got Talent faced criticism for the involvement of professional performers in the contest. Media outlets revealed evidence that the group Escala, who took in the contest in 2008, had previously been involved as guest performers for a wrap party on The X Factor in 2007. ITV refuted allegations that this was unfair conduct against other participants, by arguing that the programme's researchers applied the same process and treatment to everyone who auditioned, and that the contest was open to anyone regardless of their experience with the talent they chose to perform with.

References

2008 British television seasons
Britain's Got Talent